Visale is a general name for the community Solomon Islands. Visale is located in West Guadalcanal.
In 2004, the Sacred Heart Parish Church celebrated the 100 years anniversary of Christian faith.

References

Populated places in Guadalcanal Province